The men's football tournament at the 2023 Pan American Games will be held in Santiago from 22 October to 4 November 2023.

Qualification
A total of eight men's teams qualified to compete at the games, four CONMEBOL teams and four CONCACAF teams. For CONMEBOL, the best three teams at the 2023 South American U-20 Championship qualified, while Chile automatically qualified as hosts. For CONCACAF, the best team from each of the three zones (North American, Central American and Caribbean) at the 2022 CONCACAF U-20 Championship qualified.

Qualified teams

Note

Draw
The draw for the group stage will be held on 31 March 2023.

Squads

Players must be born on or after 1 January 2001, three overage players are allowed.

Match officials

Group stage

Group A

Group B

Knockout stage

Semi-finals

Bronze medal match

Gold medal match

Final standings

Goalscorers

References

Football at the 2023 Pan American Games